The Guest House of Imperial Envoys Museum is the former site of the Qing dynasty government yamen that ruled Taiwan. The building is located at Taipei Botanical Garden in Zhongzheng District, Taipei. The building is the only office of the Qing dynasty remaining in Taiwan.

History
The hall was built in 1882, late in the Qing period.

Function
The building served as the residential quarters for Qing government officials in Taipei on their inspection visits to Taiwan.

Transportation
The building is accessible within walking distance South from Xiaonanmen Station of the Taipei Metro.

See also
 List of tourist attractions in Taiwan
 Taiwan under Qing Dynasty rule

References

1882 establishments in China
Buildings and structures in Taipei
Government of the Qing dynasty
Tourist attractions in Taipei